Garfield Library may refer to:

Garfield Park Branch Library, Santa Cruz, California, listed on the NRHP in Santa Cruz County, California
Garfield Library (Mentor, Ohio), listed on the NRHP in Lake County, Ohio

See also
Garfield Building (disambiguation)
Garfield School (disambiguation)
Garfield House (disambiguation)